Mario Bellini (born February 1, 1935) is an Italian architect and designer. After graduating from the Polytechnic University of Milan in 1959, Bellini pursued a career as an architect, exhibition designer, product designer, and furniture designer, during the Italian economic boom of the late 20th century. Bellini has received several accolades in a variety of design fields, including eight Compasso d'Oro awards, and the Gold Medal for Lifetime Achievement by the Triennale di Milano. In 2019, the Italian President of the Chamber of Deputies, Roberto Fico, awarded Bellini a career medal, in recognition of his contributions to Italian architecture and design.

Design

In 1963 Bellini became a consultant for Olivetti where he worked on the design of the Programma 101, a precursor to the desktop computer. He continued to collaborate with Olivetti throughout the 1970s and 1980s. During this time he was involved in the design of many of the company's iconic products, such as the Lexicon 82 Electric Typewriter and the Divisumma 28 Electronic Printing Calculator.

He has worked with other companies such as B&B Italia, Brionvega, Cassina, Heller Furniture, Flou, Yamaha, Renault, Rosenthal, Tecno, Riva 1920, Vitra, and Kartell.

For many years he designed furnishing products and systems for B&B Italia and Cassina. He designed TV sets, hi-fi systems, headphones, and electric organs for Yamaha. For five years, he worked as an automobile design consultant with Renault. He has also designed for Fiat and Lancia (notably the interior of the 1980 Lancia Trevi); lamps for Artemide, Erco and Flos; and office furniture for Vitra.

Other firms for whom he has designed products and/or continues to design products include (in Italy) Acerbis, Bras, Driade, Candy, Castilia, Flou, Kartell, Marcatrè, Meritalia, Natuzzi and Poltrona Frau; (in Belgium) Ideal Standard; (in Germany) Lamy and Rosenthal; (in Japan) Fuji and Zojirushi; and (in the USA) Heller Furniture.

In 1972 Bellini was commissioned to design and build the prototype of the Kar-a-Sutra mobile environment for the exhibition “Italy: the New Domestic Landscape” at the Museum of Modern Art in New York. His Camaleonda modular sofa system, produced until 1979 by B&B Italia, was also shown in this exhibition.

In 1987 the Museum of Modern Art of New York devoted a personal retrospective exhibition to Bellini's career. At the time, the museum already included 25 of his works in its permanent collection, including a set of Olivetti machines, furniture designed in collaboration with B&B and Cassina, and the office chairs he designed for Vitra.

Mario Bellini Architects is headquartered in Milan. The 1,500 square meter building designed by Mario Bellini himself in the early 1990s. In 1999, MBA obtained ISO 9001 quality certification. Today the firm employs an average of 30 to 35 architects.

Gallery of design works

Architecture
Since the 1980s, Bellini has designed buildings in Europe, Japan, the United States, Australia and the Arab Emirates.

Projects built

 Milan Convention Centre (MICO), Europe’s largest convention centre, 2008-2012
 Museum of Islamic Arts at Louvre Museum, Paris, 2005-2012
Museum of the City of Bologna, Italy, 2004-2012
 Urban redevelopment “Verona Forum”, Verona, Italy, 2004–2011
 Radical refurbishment of the Deutsche Bank in Frankfurt, Germany, 2007–2011
National Gallery of Victoria extension and redevelopment, Melbourne, Australia, 1996–2003
 Essen International Fair Extension, Germany, 1998–2001
 Natuzzi Americas Headquarters, High Point, North Carolina, USA, 1996–1998
 Arsoa Co./Cosmetics- Headquarters, Yamanashi, Japan, 1996–1998
 New fair district of the Milan Trade Fair, 1987–1997
 Risonare Vivre Club Complex, Kobuchizawa, Japan, 1989–1992
 Tokyo Design Center, Tokyo, Japan, 1988–1992
 Yokohama Business Park, Yokohama, Japan, 1987–1991
Villa Erba Exhibition and Congress Centre, Cernobbio (Como), 1986–1990
 Thermoelectric power plant of Cassano d’Adda-Office building, 1985–1990

Projects under construction

 Architectural project of a large Scientific-Technological Park at Erzelli Hill, Genoa, Italy, 2005
 Extension and redevelopment of the Pinacoteca di Brera Milan (one of the major Italian Art Gallery), 2009
 New Cultural Centre of Turin, 2001 (to be started)

Among the best architectural creations

 New Museum of the city of Berlin, Germany, 2008
 Sheikh Zayed National Museum International Competition, Abu Dhabi, UAE, 2007
 European Patent Office, L’Aja, Holland, 2004
 Cittanova 2000, Modena, Italy, 2003
 Redevelopment of the City Centre of Tian Jin, China, 2003
 Banca CR Firenze-New H.Q., Italy, 2003
 New International Trade Fair of Milan – Rho/Pero, Milan, 2002
 Multifunctional Complex “MAB. Zeil Project”, Frankfurt, Germany, 2002
 Stolitza Towers, Moscow, 1996
 Dubai Creek Complex, Dubai, United Arab Emirates, 1994
 Goshikidai Marine Resort, Japan, 1993

Exhibitions

Bellini has been responsible for the exhibition design of many art exhibitions, among which:
"The Treasure of St. Marco in Venice", Grand Palais, Paris, and the major museums around the world, 1984–87
"Italian Art in the 20th Century", Royal Academy of Arts, London, 1989
"The Renaissance from Brunelleschi to Michelangelo. The Representation of Architecture", Palazzo Grassi, Venice, then in Paris and Berlin, 1994–95
"The Triumphs of Baroque. Architecture in Europe 1600-1750", Stupinigi Hunting Palace, Turin, 1999
"Christopher Dresser. A designer at the Court of Queen Victoria", Triennale, Milan, 2001
“Annisettanta. Il decennio lungo del secolo breve”, Triennale, 2007–2008
“Magnificenza e Progetto” Palazzo Reale, Milan, 2008–2009

Major solo exhibitions
In 1987, the Museum of Modern Art in New York organized an exhibition entitled “Mario Bellini: designer”
In 1996, the Royal Institute of British Architects (RIBA) held an exhibition of Bellini’s work as an architect
In 2000, the Municipal Gallery of Contemporary Art of Trento, Italy held a personal show entitled “Mario Bellini: a path between architecture, furniture and cars”
In December 2003, the National Gallery of Victoria in Melbourne reopened with a major exhibition on his work

References

External links
Bellini Studios website

1935 births
Living people
Architects from Milan
Italian industrial designers
Chartered designers
Polytechnic University of Milan alumni
Olivetti people
20th-century Italian architects
Domus (magazine) editors
Furniture designers
Product designers
Compasso d'Oro Award recipients